Richard H. Langley (February 22, 1937 – August 9, 2017) was an American attorney and politician in the state of Florida.

Langley was born in Lakeland. He attended the University of Florida. He served in the Florida House of Representatives for the 35th district from 1973 to 1978, as a Republican. He was elected to the State Senate for the 11th district in 1980 and served until 1992. He served on Florida's 1997 Constitutional Revision Commission.

References

1937 births
2017 deaths
Republican Party members of the Florida House of Representatives
Republican Party Florida state senators